David Lockwood  (9 April 1929 – 6 June 2014) was a British sociologist.

Early life 
Lockwood was born on 9 April 1929 in Holmfirth, England, and was the youngest child in his working-class family. His father, Herbert, was a dyer and then retrained as a cobbler after being wounded during the First World War and he died when Lockwood was 10. His mother, Edith, was a cleaner. He served in the Army Intelligence Corps from 1947 to 1949.

Life and works 
His book, The Blackcoated Worker (1958 & 1989), seeks to analyse the changes in the stratification position of the clerical worker by using a framework based on Max Weber's distinction between market and work situations. Lockwood argued that the class position of any occupation can be most successfully located by distinguishing between the material rewards gained from the market and work situations, and those symbolic rewards deriving from its status situation. His work became a very important contribution to the "proletarianisation" debate which argued that many white-collar workers were beginning to identify with manual workers by identifying their work situation as having much in common with the proletariat.

Other published work included The Affluent Worker in the Class Structure (1969) and Solidarity and Schism (1992).

Family life 
Lockwood was married to the gender studies pioneer Leonore Davidoff, whom he met while studying at LSE. They had three sons: Matthew, Ben, and Harold.

Lockwood died on 6 June 2014.

See also
 Macrosociology

References

Footnotes

Works cited

External links 
David Lockwood at "Pioneers of Qualitative Research" from the Economic and Social Data Service

1929 births
2014 deaths
Academics of the University of Essex
British sociologists
Commanders of the Order of the British Empire
Fellows of the British Academy
Military personnel from Yorkshire
Intelligence Corps officers